Xiaoyi is a county-level city under the administration of Lüliang prefecture-level city, in Shanxi Province, China.

Xiaoyi was built by the State of Jin in 594 BC, named Guayang in Spring and Autumn period. It was renamed Zhongyang in Three Kingdoms period and Yong'an in Northern Wei period. In 627 AD (Tang Dynasty), It was renamed Xiaoyi by Emperor Taizong of Tang.

Xiaoyi is known for its mineral resources, including coal, Iron ore and bauxite. It is also known for walnuts and shadow play.

Climate

Notable people
 

Su Ning (1953–1991), military officer

References

External links
 Xiaoyi government website (in Chinese)

Cities in Shanxi
County-level divisions of Shanxi